Branham House may refer to:

 Branham House (Georgetown, Kentucky), listed on the NRHP in Scott County, Kentucky
Richard Branham House, Midway, Kentucky, listed on the National Register of Historic Places in Scott County, Kentucky
Timberlake-Branham House, Charlottesville, Virginia, listed on the National Register of Historic Places in Charlottesville, Virginia